Kothuru is a village in Eluru district of the Indian state of Andhra Pradesh. It is located in Pedapadu mandal of Eluru revenue division.

Demographics 

 Census of India, Kothuru had a population of 3082. The total population constitutes 1521 males and 1561 females with a sex ratio of 1026 females per 1000 males. 312 children are in the age group of 0–6 years with sex ratio of 1094. The average literacy rate stands at 73.47%.

References 

Villages in Eluru district